The striped weever, Trachinus lineolatus, is a fish of the family Trachinidae.

References

striped weever
Fauna of Guinea-Bissau
Fauna of São Tomé and Príncipe
Marine fauna of Central Africa
striped weever